Kyabram railway station was opened on Friday, 19 August 1887. It is on the Toolamba–Echuca railway line, in Victoria, Australia.

Status

The line has not been used for passenger services for some time, and even freight movements on this line are running again and have been for some time.

Infrastructure

The platform at Kyabram still exists in a reasonable condition, with a gravel car park. There is also a siding track still present at this location. Flashing lights were provided at the nearby Albion Street level crossing, located towards Toolamba, in 1972. The former toilet block was demolished in August 1986. The Down end crossover points were spiked out of use around this time. In May 1988, the goods platform and storage shed were demolished. A number of sidings were abolished in 1991, including No. 3 road and the stock siding.

References

 
 

Railway stations in Australia opened in 1887
Disused railway stations in Victoria (Australia)